The White River Kid (also titled White River and The Conmen) is a 1999 American comedy film directed by Arne Glimcher and starring Bob Hoskins, Antonio Banderas and Ellen Barkin.  It is based on the novel The Little Brothers of St. Mortimer by John Fergus Ryan.

Cast
 Bob Hoskins as Brother Edgar
 Antonio Banderas as Morales Pittman
 Ellen Barkin as Eva Nell La Fangroy
 Wes Bentley as White River Kid
 Kim Dickens as Apple Lisa
 Randy Travis as Sheriff Becker
 Swoosie Kurtz as Mummy Weed
 Beau Bridges as Daddy Weed
 Michael Massee as Ralph Pines
 Chad Lindberg as Reggie Weed

Production
The film was shot in Hot Springs, Arkansas, Mount Ida, Arkansas and Petit Jean State Park.

Reception
Ann Hodges of the Houston Chronicle graded the film a B−.

References

External links
 
 

1999 comedy films
1990s American films
1990s English-language films
American comedy films
Films based on American novels
Films directed by Arne Glimcher
Films produced by Elie Samaha
Films scored by John Frizzell (composer)
Films shot in Arkansas
Franchise Pictures films